The 2001 Majorca Open singles was a professional tennis competition. Marat Safin was the defending champion but did not compete that year. Alberto Martín won in the final 6–3, 3–6, 6–2 against Guillermo Coria.

Seeds
A champion seed is indicated in bold text while text in italics indicates the round in which that seed was eliminated.

  Andrei Pavel (first round)
  Tommy Haas (first round)
  Carlos Moyá (semifinals)
  Guillermo Coria (final)
  Francisco Clavet (first round)
  Nicolas Kiefer (quarterfinals)
  Fernando Vicente (second round)
  Albert Portas (first round)

Draw

See also
Association of Tennis Professionals
History of tennis

References

External links
 2001 Majorca Open draw

Singles